Dilton Marsh railway station serves the village of Dilton Marsh in Wiltshire, England. Great Western Railway manages the station and operates services between Bristol and the South Coast which call there.

History

The Great Western Railway opened the station as Dilton Marsh Halt on 1 June 1937, on a curved embankment next to the bridge where the line crosses the eastern and of Dilton Marsh High Street, on the southwestern outskirts of Westbury.

Since it was a halt, there were no staff to sell tickets; instead, a sign directed passengers to the "7th house up the hill", where Mrs H. Roberts sold tickets, on a commission basis, from her home until 1947. The platforms are staggered either side of the road underbridge and are about 100m apart, approached by ramps from either side of the rail bridge.

In 1969 the station was renamed as Dilton Marsh, and the platforms were reduced to the length of one coach.  British Rail tried to close the station but was met by strong local opposition.  The platforms were in poor condition and so were rebuilt in concrete. The station reopened after an eight-week closure on 1 May 1994. In 2018, the wooden shelters and fencing on both platforms were replaced by standard Network Rail bus-shelter-style shelters in glass and metal with galvanised fencing.

Services
Although it is a request stop, the station is quite well served. In the 2016 timetable, eight trains per day call on weekdays southbound (with an additional service on Saturdays) and eleven northbound. The base frequency is every two hours each way, increasing to hourly at peak times. On Sundays, eight trains call in each direction: these are all through services on the Cardiff and Bristol to Portsmouth route.

Cultural References 
The station is the subject of the poem 'Dilton Marsh Halt' by John Betjeman:Was it worth keeping the Halt open,
We thought as we looked at the sky 
Red through the spread of the cedar-tree, 
With the evening train gone by? 

Yes, we said, for in summer the anglers use it, 
Two and sometimes three 
Will bring their catches of rods and poles and perches 
To Westbury, home for tea. 

There isn't a porter. The platform is made of sleepers. 
The guard of the last train puts out the light 
And high over lorries and cattle the Halt unwinking 
Waits through the Wiltshire night. 

O housewife safe in the comprehensive churning 
Of the Warminster launderette! 
O husband down at the depot with car in car-park!
The Halt is waiting yet. 

And when all the horrible roads are finally done for, 
And there's no more petrol left in the world to burn, 
Here to the Halt from Salisbury and from Bristol 
Steam trains will return.

See also
 Salisbury branch line (Great Western Railway)

References

External links
Dilton Marsh - Least Used Station In Wiltshire 2017 YouTube video by Geoff Marshall about the station.

Railway stations in Wiltshire
Railway stations in Great Britain opened in 1937
Former Great Western Railway stations
Railway stations served by Great Western Railway
Railway request stops in Great Britain
1937 establishments in England
DfT Category F2 stations